Asmi Shrestha (born 30 June 1993) is a Nepalese model and the 2016 Miss Nepal titleholder. She won the Miss Nepal 2016 beauty contest and represented Nepal at Miss World 2016. Prior to participating in the Miss Nepal competition, Shrestha won the "Face of Classic Diamond Jewellers" competition in 2014.

Early life and education 
Shrestha was born on 30 June 1993 in Tandi, Chitwan. She obtained a Bachelor of Business Administration from Ace Institute of Management, Kathmandu, in 2016.

Career
In 2010, Shrestha started her modelling career at age 16 at the Classic Diamond Jewelers. In 2012, she was featured in Sonam Tashi Gurung's music video for Birsana Sakinna.

In 2014, she competed in the Face of Diamond category at the Classic Diamond Jewelers, where she won the main title.

Miss Nepal 2016

In 2016, Shrestha participated in the Miss Nepal 2016 competition as contestant number 11. She won the title for Best Evening Gown, Miss Photogenic, and Miss Personality before taking the main title of Miss Nepal World 2016.

Miss World 2016
Shrestha rose to Top 5 in the Beauty with a Purpose category at Miss World 2016.

Music videos 
Asmi Shrestha has also made her debut in the music video scene of Nepal. As of May 2022, she has appeared in three music videos:

References
 "Asmi Shrestha won Miss Nepal 2016", Lagatar.com. Retrieved 8 April 2016.

External links
 Biography on WikiNepal
 Official website

1993 births
Living people
Miss Nepal winners
Nepalese female models
Nepalese beauty pageant winners
Miss World 2016 delegates
People from Chitwan District